The 2011 Prince Edward Island general election was held on October 3, 2011.

The Liberal government of Premier Robert Ghiz was elected to a second majority government, winning one seat less than they did in 2007. Ghiz himself considered 18 seats to be a marker for a strong majority. He won 22.

Health care was an important issue during the election, especially in rural areas.

The Progressive Conservatives retained their position as Official Opposition, winning five seats. Olive Crane used the issue of the Provincial Nominee Program during the election, as well as issues surrounding immigration and investments that came under investigation by the Royal Canadian Mounted Police and Federal Minister Jason Kenney during the election.

Results
Both the Liberals and Progressive Conservatives lost votes, and lost in the share of vote. Turnout was down and seven thousand fewer voters cast ballots total. The Greens and New Democrats increased both their raw vote and their share of the vote, and the new Island party took nearly a full percentage point. Three incumbent Liberal MLAs were defeated by Progressive Conservatives; the Progressive Conservatives retained one of the two seats they held at the dissolution of the previous legislature, as well as one vacant seat which they held prior to the resignation of Michael Currie from the legislature in March 2011, while the Liberals gained one seat whose Progressive Conservative incumbent did not stand for re-election.

The election saw one riding, Kellys Cross-Cumberland, have six candidates, a rarity in PEI elections.

The PC Party solidified their base in central-east PEI, winning four ridings that were part of the federal riding of Cardigan, and carried the region. The PC Party also managed to win a single seat on the northern tip of the Island.

|- bgcolor=CCCCCC
!rowspan="2" colspan="2" align=left|Party
!rowspan="2" align=left|Party leader
!rowspan="2"|Candidates
!colspan="4" align=center|Seats
!colspan="3" style="text-align:center;"|Popular vote
|- bgcolor=CCCCCC
|align="center"|2007
|align="center"|Dissol.
|align="center"|2011
| style="text-align:center;"|Change
| style="text-align:center;"|#
| style="text-align:center;"|%
| style="text-align:center;"|Change

|align=left|Robert Ghiz
|align="right"|27
|align="right"|23
|align="right"|24
|align="right"|22
|align="right"|-1
|align="right"|38,315
|align="right"|51.38%
|align="right"|-1.55%

|align=left|Olive Crane
|align="right"|27
|align="right"|4
|align="right"|2
|align="right"|5
|align="right"|+1
|align="right"|29,950
|align="right"|40.16%
|align="right"|-1.19%

|align=left|Sharon Labchuk
|align="right"| 22
|align="right"| -
|align="right"| -
|align="right"| 0
|align="right"|
|align="right"|3,254
|align="right"|4.36%
|align="right"|+1.32%

|align=left|James Rodd
|align="right"| 14
|align="right"| -
|align="right"| -
|align="right"| 0
|align="right"|
|align="right"|2,355
|align="right"|3.16%
|align="right"|+1.20%

|align=left|Billy Cann
|align="right"|12
|align="right"|*
|align="right"| -
|align="right"| 0
|align="right"|
|align="right"|682
|align="right"|0.91%
|align="right"|*

|align=left|
|align="right"|1
|align="right"| -
|align="right"| -
|align="right"| 0
|align="right"|
|align="right"|15
|align="right"|0.02%
|align="right"|-0.71%

|align=left|
|align="right"| -
|align="right"| -
|align="right"| 1
|colspan="5" align="right"|
|-
| style="text-align:left;" colspan="3"|Total
| style="text-align:right;"|103
| style="text-align:right;"|27
| style="text-align:right;"|27
| style="text-align:right;"|27
| style="text-align:right;"|
| style="text-align:right;"|74,571
| style="text-align:right;"|
| style="text-align:right;"|
|}
* The Island Party of Prince Edward Island was not a registered political party at the time of the 2007 election.

Synopsis of results

 = open seat
 = turnout is above provincial average
 = incumbency arose from byelection gain
 = incumbent re-elected in same riding
 = other incumbent renominated

Results by region

Incumbent MLAs not running for re-election

Progressive Conservative
 Michael Currie (resigned, March 28, 2011), Georgetown-St. Peters
 Jim Bagnall, Montague-Kilmuir

Opinion polls

Riding by riding results

Cardigan

|-
|bgcolor="whitesmoke"|Belfast-Murray River
||
|Charlie McGeoghegan  1,135 - (45.86%)
|
|Darlene Compton  1,127 - (45.54%)
|
|John Burhoe  114 - (4.61%)
|
|
|
|Andy Clarey  99 - (4.00%)
|
| 
||
|Charlie McGeoghegan
|-
|bgcolor="whitesmoke"|Georgetown-St. Peters
|
|Kevin Gotell  1,214 - (41.08%)
|| 
|Steven Myers  1,575 - (53.30%)
|
|Jason Furness  47 - (1.59%)
|
|Jane Dunphy  87 - (2.94%)
|
|Ray Cantelo  32 - (1.08%)
|
| 
||
|Vacant
|-
|bgcolor="whitesmoke"|Montague-Kilmuir
||
|Allen Roach  1,127 - (46.57%)
|
|Greg Farrell  1,004 - (41.49%)
|
|Vanessa Young  89 - (3.68%)
|
| 
|
|Billy Cann  200 - (8.26%)
|
| 
||
|Jim Bagnall†
|-
|bgcolor="whitesmoke"|Morell-Mermaid
|
|Dan MacDonald  1,033 - (36.51%)
|| 
|Olive Crane  1,649 - (58.29%)
|
|Darcie Lanthier  114 - (4.03%)
|
|
|
|Roger Nowe  33 - (1.17%)
|
|
||
|Olive Crane
|-
|bgcolor="whitesmoke"|Souris-Elmira
|
|Allan Campbell  1,272 - (47.46%)
||
|Colin LaVie  1,302 - (48.58%)
|
|
|
|
|
|Jason MacGregor  106 - (3.96%)
|
|
||
|Allan Campbell
|-
|bgcolor="whitesmoke"|Stratford-Kinlock
|
|Cynthia Dunsford  1,241 - (34.15%)
|| 
|James Aylward  2,020 - (55.59%)
|
|Donald Killorn  168 - (4.62%)
|
|Chris van Ouwerkerk  205 - (5.64%)
|
|
|
| 
||
|Cynthia Dunsford
|-
|bgcolor="whitesmoke"|Vernon River-Stratford
|| 
|Alan McIsaac  1,311 - (50.52%)
|
|Mary Ellen McInnis  1,054 - (40.62%)
|
|Marion Pirch  119 - (4.59%)
|
|Edith Perry  111 - (4.28%)
|
| 
|
|
||
|Alan McIsaac
|}

Malpeque

|-
|bgcolor="whitesmoke"|Borden-Kinkora
||
|George Webster  1,590 - (49.41%)
|
|Jamie Fox 1,468 - (45.62%)
|
|Conor Leggott  160 - (4.97%)
|
| 
|
| 
|
|
||
|George Webster
|-
|bgcolor="whitesmoke"|Cornwall-Meadowbank
|| 
|Ron MacKinley  1,686 - (63.46%)
|
|Larry Hogan  756 - (28.45%)
|
|Allieanna Ballagh  172 - (6.47%)
|
|
|
|Jay Gallant  43 - (1.62%)
|
|
||
|Ron MacKinley
|-
|bgcolor="whitesmoke"|Kellys Cross-Cumberland
|| 
|Valerie Docherty  1,768 - (54.10%)
|
|Neila Auld  960 - (29.38%)
|
|Peter Bevan-Baker  306 - (9.36%)
|
|Jesse Reddin Cousins  182 - (5.56%)
|
|Paul Smitz  37 - (1.13%)
|
|Arthur C. Mackenzie   15 - (0.46%)
||
|Valerie Docherty
|-
|bgcolor="whitesmoke"|Kensington-Malpeque
|| 
|Wes Sheridan  1,820 - (57.18%)
|
|Wilber Lamont  1,165 - (36.60%)
|
|
|
|George S. Hunter  198 - (6.22%)
|
|
|
|
||
|Wes Sheridan
|-
|bgcolor="whitesmoke"|Rustico-Emerald
||
|Carolyn Bertram  1,498 (49.50%)
|
|Brad Trivers  1,341 - (44.32%)
|
|Ron Wagner  187- (6.18%)
|
| 
|
| 
|
| 
||
|Carolyn Bertram
|-
|bgcolor="whitesmoke"|York-Oyster Bed
|| 
|Robert Vessey  1,988 - (55.30%)
|
|Martie Murphy  1,235 - (34.25%)
|
|Jenet Clement  122 - (3.39%)
|
|James Rodd  250 - (6.95%)
|
|
|
| 
||
|Robert Vessey
|}

Charlottetown

|-
|bgcolor="whitesmoke"|Charlottetown-Brighton
|| 
|Robert Ghiz  1,228 - (52.46%)
|
|Linda Clements  699 - (29.86%)
|
|Elizabeth Schoales  238 - (10.17%)
|
|Trevor John LeClerc  176 - (7.52%)
|
| 
|
| 
|| 
|Robert Ghiz
|-
|bgcolor="whitesmoke"|Charlottetown-Lewis Point
|| 
|Kathleen Casey  1,411 - (52.01%)
|
|Parnell Kelly  895 - (32.99%)
|
|Charles Sanderson  132 - (4.87%)
|
|Jacquie Robichaud  275 - (10.14%)
|
| 
|
| 
|| 
|Kathleen Casey
|-
|bgcolor="whitesmoke"|Charlottetown-Parkdale
|| 
|Doug Currie  1,510 - (61.76%)
|
|Bernie Flynn  665 - (27.20%)
|
|Eliza Knockwood  152 - (6.22%)
|
|Noel Pauley  118 - (4.83%)
|
| 
|
|
|| 
|Doug Currie
|-
|bgcolor="whitesmoke"|Charlottetown-Sherwood
|| 
|Robert Mitchell  1,538 - (53.93%)
|
|Mike Gillis  1,060 - (37.17%)
|
|Sarah Jones  127 - (4.45%)
|
|Kat Murphy  127 - (4.45%)
|
|
|
| 
|| 
|Robert Mitchell
|-
|bgcolor="whitesmoke"|Charlottetown-Victoria Park
|| 
|Richard Brown  1,112- (51.29%)
|
|Myles MacKinnon  582- (26.85%)
|
|Sharon Labchuk  278 - (12.82%)
|
|Rita Jackson  177 - (8.16%)
|
|Philip Stewart  19 - (0.88%)
|
| 
|| 
|Richard Brown
|-
|bgcolor="whitesmoke"|Tracadie-Hillsborough Park
||
|Buck Watts  1,304 - (48.53%)
|
|Glen Kelly  1,136 - (42.28%)
|
|Helene LaRouche  93 - (3.46%)
|
|Ron Kelly  136 - (5.06%)
|
|Gary Chipman  18 - (0.67%)
|
| 
||
|Buck Watts
|-
|bgcolor="whitesmoke"|West Royalty-Springvale
||
|Bush Dumville  1,432 - (45.93%)
|
|Gary Bowness  1,369 - (43.91%)
|
|Liz Vaine  151 - (4.84%)
|
|Andrew Want  166 - (5.32%)
|
| 
|
| 
||
|Bush Dumville
|}

Egmont

|-
|bgcolor="whitesmoke"|Alberton-Roseville
|| 
|Pat Murphy  1,604 - (56.18%)
|
|David Gordon  1,137 - (39.82%)
|
|Gerald O'Meara  71 - (2.49%)
|
|
|
|Mitch Gallant  43 - (1.51%)
|
| 
|| 
|Pat Murphy
|-
|bgcolor="whitesmoke"|Evangeline-Miscouche
|| 
|Sonny Gallant  1,722 - (77.22%)
|
|Edgar Arsenault  418 - (18.74%)
|
|Melissa Hotte  64 - (2.87%)
|
|
|
|Arthur Arsenault  26 - (1.17%)
|
| 
|| 
|Sonny Gallant
|-
|bgcolor="whitesmoke"|O'Leary-Inverness
|| 
|Robert Henderson  1,431 - (55.51%)
|
|Daniel MacDonald  1,147 - (44.49%)
|
|
|
| 
|
| 
|
| 
|| 
|Robert Henderson
|-
|bgcolor="whitesmoke"|Summerside-St. Eleanors
|| 
|Gerard Greenan  1,426 - (51.76%)
|
|Merlin Cormier  1,037 - (37.64%)
|
|Caleb Adams  145 - (5.26%)
|
|Paulette Halupa  147 - (5.30%)
|
|
|
|
|| 
|Gerard Greenan
|-
|bgcolor="whitesmoke"|Summerside-Wilmot
|| 
|Janice Sherry  1,382 - (54.74%)
|
|Shirley Anne Cameron  937 - (37.12%)
|
|Rosalyn Ridlington Abbott  205 - (8.12%)
|
|
|
|
|
| 
|| 
|Janice Sherry
|-
|bgcolor="whitesmoke"|Tignish-Palmer Road
|
|Neil LeClair   1,142 (48.74%)
||
|Hal Perry   1,175 - (50.15%)
|
|
|
| 
|
|Derek D. Peters   26 - (1.11%)
|
| 
|| 
|Neil LeClair
|-
|bgcolor="whitesmoke"|Tyne Valley-Linkletter
|| 
|Paula Biggar  1,390 - (57.27%)
|
|Jim Henwood  1,037 - (42.73%)
|
|
|
|
| 
|
|
| 
|| 
|Paula Biggar
|}

References

Further reading

External links
 Election Almanac - Prince Edward Island Provincial Election 2011

2011
2011 elections in Canada
2011 in Prince Edward Island
October 2011 events in Canada